Kaucsár József (in Hungarian, his nationality) or Iosif Kaucsar (in Romanian), known in France as Joseph Kaucsar (20 September 1904 – 1986) was a Hungarian (born near the border between Romania and Hungary)-French footballer who played for SO Montpellier and the France national team. His brother, Alfred Kaucsar, was also a footballer, they played together at SO Montpellier.

References

Roger Rabier, Allez SOM, 1985, pp. 234–235.
Profile on French federation official site

1904 births
1986 deaths
French footballers
France international footballers
Romanian footballers
Montpellier HSC players
Montpellier HSC managers
Ligue 1 players
Ligue 2 players
Romanian emigrants to France
Association football midfielders
Romanian football managers